Pink dolphin may refer to:

Chinese white dolphin (Sousa chinensis chinensis), of the Pearl River Delta that also occur in Southeast Asia and breed from South Africa to Australia 
Amazon river dolphin (Inia geoffrensis), live in the river systems of Brazil, Bolivia, Peru, Ecuador, Colombia and Venezuela
Pink Dolphin Monument on Galveston Island, Texas

Animal common name disambiguation pages